Võ Văn Ba (1923 – 8 June 1975) was a spy for South Vietnam and the United States' Central Intelligence Agency (CIA) during the Vietnam War.

Early life
Võ was born in 1923 in Long An province, French Cochinchina.

Career
Võ joined the Vietcong (VC) and served as a cadre in Tây Ninh province.

In the mid 1960s he was recruited by the South Vietnamese Police Special Branch and from 1969 onwards he was run as a spy by the South Vietnamese and the CIA. He provided his handlers with correspondence and plans from the Central Office for South Vietnam (COSVN), the North Vietnamese political and military headquarters that controlled the insurgency in South Vietnam.

At the end of his career he was serving as communist party secretary for Phu Kuong district, Tây Ninh province with responsibility for recruiting members of the Cao Dai religious sect.

Frank Snepp, who served as a CIA agent at the Embassy of the United States, Saigon from 1969 to the Fall of Saigon in April 1975, described Võ as the most important intelligence asset of the war, saying he was the equivalent of having a spy in Hitler's bunker.

Capture and death
As South Vietnam collapsed in the face of the North Vietnamese 1975 spring offensive, the North Vietnamese captured many South Vietnamese military and intelligence officers including a Mr. Phuong who identified Võ as a South Vietnamese spy. Võ was arrested in Tây Ninh province on the last day of the war, 30 April 1975. According to North Vietnamese sources he committed suicide while in prison awaiting trial on 8 June 1975.

References

Vietnamese communists
1923 births
1975 deaths
People from Long An Province